Robert Lester Lord (January 6, 1934 – February 16, 2008), better known as Bobby Lord, was an American country music artist popular in the 1950s and 1960s.

Biography
Lord was born January 6, 1934, in Sanford, Florida, but grew up in Tampa.  As a teenager, he entered talent contests, wowing crowds with his edgy rockabilly style. He was popular with Tampa's young crowd, playing concerts at dance halls. At Plant High School, he met his wife, Mozelle, whom he married when he was 20.

After graduating from Plant, he was offered the chance to host his own television show while a freshman at the University of Tampa. The Bobby Lord Homefolks Show was an hour-long program on Saturday nights on WSUN-TV in St. Petersburg and featured Lord singing with a backing band. In 1952, he won a nationwide talent competition sponsored by TV Guide which led to an appearance on Paul Whiteman's TV Teen Club on ABC-TV from Philadelphia.

Soon after, songwriter Boudleaux Bryant heard one of Lord's demo tapes and passed it on to Columbia Records, which signed him in 1953. At age 19, he was the label's youngest recording star. He began releasing country and rockabilly hits for Columbia, and in 1955 joined Ozark Jubilee, an ABC-TV program based in Springfield, Missouri.

In 1960, the Jubilee was canceled and Lord moved to Nashville, where he was immediately offered a spot on the Grand Ole Opry. He continued appearing on the Opry well into the 1970s. He recorded for Hickory Records starting in 1961 and Decca Records from 1967. During this time he also hosted a daily afternoon show on WSM-TV in Nashville, which was the counterpart to Ralph Emery's morning show on that station, "Opry Almanac". Under the auspices of WSM-TV, he also hosted a weekly syndicated half-hour program featuring popular country artists. Lord's backing band on the syndicated show included Jerry Byrd on steel guitar, Jerry Whitehurst on piano and Spider Wilson on guitar.

In 1969, Lord left Nashville and went into semi-retirement from the music industry to devote time to his family and his interests in real estate and insurance. In the 1980s, he hosted TNN's program Country Sportsman, later called Celebrity Outdoors, until 1989. He was also the author of the 1969 book, Hit the Glory Road.

Bobby Lord died on February 16, 2008, in Stuart, Florida, at the age of 74. He was a resident of Jensen Beach, Florida, and was survived by his widow, Mozelle, and three children

Discography

Albums

Singles

Notes

References
 Davis, William (1998). "Bobby Lord". In The Encyclopedia of Country Music. Paul Kingsbury, Editor. New York: Oxford University Press. p. 303.

External links
 Bobby Lord at Hillbilly-Music.com
 Bobby Lord obituary

1934 births
2008 deaths
People from Sanford, Florida
American country guitarists
American male guitarists
American country singer-songwriters
Grand Ole Opry members
Henry B. Plant High School alumni
Singer-songwriters from Florida
20th-century American singers
20th-century American guitarists
People from Jensen Beach, Florida
Guitarists from Florida
Columbia Records artists
Hickory Records artists
Decca Records artists
Country musicians from Florida
20th-century American male musicians
American male singer-songwriters
Television personalities from Florida